Slup is a toponym and may refer to:

 Slup, Czech Republic
 Slup, Kosovo

See also
 Słup (disambiguation)